The House of Laments (Spanish: "Casa de los lamentos") is a historic place in Guanajuato, Guanajuato, Mexico. The mansion dates to the 18th century. During the 1890s and 1900s, the Tadeo Fulgencío Mejía serial murders occurred here. He was a Mexican serial killer motivated by the idea of contacting his deceased wife. Now the house functions as museum, and the local legend says several paranormal phenomena happen in the mansion.

History

During the 18th century, the Marquess of San Clemente commanded the construction of the mansion, for his daughter. In the 19th century the house was a post office until 1890 when Tadeo Fulgencío Mejía, a mines of De Cata y de Mellano mining engineer, bought the property.

The Tadeo Mejía crimes
Tadeo Mejía's wife, Constanza de la Rivera, died in 1890 during an assault. According with some versions, the murder of Constanza occurred during a domestic invasion orchested for employees of the mine where Mejía worked, they accused him of malversation but really the mine suffered an economic crisis and for this reason the salaries had been late. Costanza was stabbed in the neck. According with other versions, Costanza died in a street near to hose.

Supposedly, her death caused the psychosis of Tadeo Mejía. He consulted with a "witch", who showed him strange rituals that included human sacrifices of young men and women. Tadeo Mejía committed an unknown number of murders, but several human bones were located in the mansion's basement.

See also
List of serial killers by country

References

19th-century criminals
Buildings and structures in Guanajuato
Crimes involving Satanism or the occult
Guanajuato City
Houses completed in the 18th century
Male serial killers
Mexican legends
Mexican serial killers
Museums in Guanajuato
Museums in Mexico
Reportedly haunted locations in Mexico
Tourist attractions in Guanajuato